(born 27 November 1957) is a Japanese video game designer, director, producer and businessman who is the president of The Pokémon Company. Prior to working with the Pokémon series, Ishihara was part of Ape Inc. and worked on titles such as EarthBound, and then years later he founded Creatures Inc.

Ishihara's work with Pokémon, in which he was involved since early development stages during the 1990s had him as a producer from Creatures while he also heavily focused on licensed and spin-off products such as the Pokémon Trading Card Game, with him founding The Pokémon Company to handle such business activities. He was also crucial in the development of Pokémon Go, having supported the concept of a location-based Pokémon game.

Career
Ishihara was born on 27 November 1957 in the city of Toba, Mie Prefecture. In 1983, he completed a Masters in Art and Design at the University of Tsukuba. After his graduation, he joined Ape Inc. in 1991, where he worked in the development of various video games, among others  Mario & Wario (1993), and EarthBound (1994). In 1995, after leaving Ape Inc., Ishihara founded the development company Creatures Inc., with assistance from Satoru Iwata.  As of 2022, Ishihara was still Representative Director and Chairman at Creatures.

Pokémon
When the planning and development for the Pokémon series began in 1990, Ishihara worked with Game Freak as a producer at Creatures to develop the Red and Green titles, at one point with Creatures providing a cash infusion during the company's financial difficulty to help them in the development of the game. Following the title's release, Ishihara founded the Pokémon Center Company - today The Pokémon Company - and became its Representative Director.

Prior to Red and Greens release, Ishihara initiated the development of the Pokémon Trading Card Game. In an interview, Satoru Iwata noted that people involved with Creatures Inc. would refer to Ishihara as "The King Of Portable Toys" due to Ishihara's extensive involvement on licensed Pokémon products - including the trading cards, anime, and movie; according to Ishihara, his involvement and focus on the licensed products was to ensure that the next titles in the series - which he was again involved in - were successful.

Ishihara stated that he had initially expected Gold and Silver to be his final Pokémon games intending to leave the series after the two games were finalised; however, following their success, increased requests for licensed Pokémon products prompted a joint venture between Nintendo, Game Freak and Creatures Inc. to establish The Pokémon Company in 2000, which was meant to take licensing and brand management tasks away from Game Freak, which was to focus on working on the next titles. Ishihara was then placed as president and CEO of the new company.  During the development of the FireRed and LeafGreen remakes, Ishihara - with inspiration from Iwata - included wireless technology in the games, in place of existing Pokémon trading through cables in previous titles. Ishihara was also involved with the tie-in "Pokéwalker" in HeartGold and SoulSilver.

In 2014, following an April Fools prank on Google Maps involving users "catching" Pokémon on the app, Ishihara began to negotiate licensing of Pokémon characters for an augmented reality game with Niantic Labs. Ishihara had been an avid player of Niantic's Ingress title, and he endorsed the planned game - which secured support from Iwata. Upon its release in 2016, the title Pokémon Go was considered a massive success, with Ishihara referring to its cultural impact as a "Pokédemic", comparing it to the peak popularity of Pokémon in the late 1990s.

During an interview with Bloomberg, Ishihara noted that he was initially skeptical on the Nintendo Switch's success, doubting the prospects of a video game console with the abundance of smartphones. Despite this, they naturally started development on several Nintendo Switch games as a Nintendo affiliate. Later, in 2019, Ishihara announced the title Pokémon Sleep slated for a 2020 release, which he stated was to make "players to look forward to waking up every morning".

Games
Only works before the first game credited to Ishihara as executive producer when he became President of The Pokémon Company, as in future titles he's always listed as Executive Producer, a business credit.

Otocky (1987) - Sedic
Mendel Palace (1989) - Special Thanks
Knight Move (1990) - Producer
Yoshi (1991) - Producer
Tetris 2 + BomBliss (1991) - Puzzle Problem Creator, Producer
Super Tetris 2 + BomBliss (1992) - Bombliss Supervisor, Puzzle Problems Creator
Monopoly (Super Famicom) (1993) - Director
Sanrio World Smash Ball! (1993) - Director
Mario & Wario (1993) - Producer
EarthBound (1994) - Special Effects Artist, Line Producer
Mario's Picross (1995) - Director
The Monopoly Game 2 (1995) - Project Manager
Tetris Blast (1995) - Tetris Blast Supervisor
Mario's Super Picross (1995) - Director, Screen Graphic Designer
Pokémon Red and Green (1996) - Producer
Pokémon Blue (1996) - Producer
Picross 2 (1996) - Director
Pocket Monsters Stadium (1998) - Producer
Pokémon Yellow (1998) - Producer
Hey You, Pikachu! (1998) - Producer
Pokémon Trading Card Game (1998) - Producer
Super Smash Bros. (1999) - Original Game Staff (Pokémon Products Supervisor; "Pokémon", "EarthBound" Produce)
Pokémon Snap (1999) - Pokémon Producer
Pokémon Pinball (1999) - Producer
Pokémon Stadium (1999) - Producer
Pokémon Gold and Silver (1999) - Producer
Custom Robo (1999) - Producer
Doshin the Giant (1999) - Executive Producer
Pokémon Puzzle Challenge (2000) - Production
Pokémon Puzzle League (2000) - Licensing Supervisor
Custom Robo V2 (2000) - Supervisor
Pokémon Card GB2: Here Comes Team GR! (2000) - Producer
Pokémon Crystal (2000) - Producer
Pokémon Stadium 2 (2000) - Producer

Awards
 CEDEC Awards 2011 - Special Award.
 Minister of Economy, Trade and Industry Award 2011.
 Japan Innovators Award 2016 - Soft Power Award (along with John Hanke).

References

1957 births
Living people
Nintendo people
Japanese video game producers
Pokémon
People from Mie Prefecture
University of Tsukuba alumni
Japanese video game businesspeople
20th-century Japanese businesspeople
21st-century Japanese businesspeople